Angelus TV was a Portuguese Catholic television channel founded in 2017 in the city of Fátima, Portugal. The headquarters of this TV station were near the Sanctuary of Our Lady of Fatima in the Cova da Iria, from which transmitted multiple daily celebrations.

It was distributed on cable television systems in Portugal and via internet television worldwide.

Due to the lack of financial support, this Catholic television channel ceased broadcasting from 31 May 2019.

Religious services and devotional programs 
A partial listing of CatholicTV programs:

 Candles procession from the Sanctuary of Fátima
 The Angelus from the St. Peter's Square in Vatican City
 Holy Mass from the Basilica of Our Lady of the Rosary
 Rosary from the Chapel of the Apparitions of Our Lady of Fátima

Patron saints 
Our Lady of Fátima was the patroness of Angelus TV. The shepherd visionaries of Our Lady, Jacinta and Francisco Marto were also considered as patron saints of this Portuguese Catholic channel.

See also
 Catholic television
 Catholic television channels
 Catholic television networks
 International religious television broadcasters
 Roman Catholic Diocese of Leiria–Fátima
 Telepace
 Vatican Media

References

External links
 Angelus TV – Official Website
 Angelus TV online broadcast

Catholic television networks
Catholic television channels
Television networks in Portugal
Television stations in Portugal
Television channels and stations established in 2017